Julia Boserup (born September 9, 1991) is an American retired tennis player of Danish descent.

Boserup began playing tennis at age six, after her mother, a native of Denmark, enrolled her in group tennis lessons. She was home schooled in high school, which allowed her to focus more time on her tennis career which began in 2006.

In 2017, she reached her highest WTA singles ranking of world No. 80, whilst her best doubles ranking was No. 218.

However, she suffered from injuries, and in May 2019, she announced her retirement.

Junior accomplishments
Boserup won the USTA Orange Bowl in 2008, outlasting fellow American Christina McHale in three sets, in the final match.

Professional career
Boserup reached the third round of the 2016 Wimbledon Championships and in 2017 she defeated French Open champion Francesca Schiavone in the first round of the Australian Open. In 2014, Julia reached the quarterfinals of the WTA Tour event in Monterrey, Mexico, defeating world No. 24, Kirsten Flipkens, in the first round.

In her professional career, Boserup has competed mainly on the ITF Women's Circuit where has won three singles titles and one doubles title. After qualifying, Boserup made her Grand Slam main-draw debut at the 2016 Wimbledon Championships, where she defeated Tatjana Maria in the first round. In the second round, she triumphed over Belinda Bencic due to a second set retirement before she was beaten by Elena Vesnina. In 2011, she competed as a qualifier in the US Open, losing in the first qualifying round to Elitsa Kostova. In early 2012, she also competed as a qualifier at the Australian Open, winning two matches before falling in the third round of qualifying.

ITF finals

Singles: 6 (3–3)

Doubles: 4 (1–3)

References

External links

 
 

1991 births
Living people
American female tennis players
American people of Danish descent
Tennis players from Santa Monica, California
21st-century American women